Tsarskoye Selo railway station is a railway station located in Pushkin, Saint Petersburg, Russia. It is 23 km down-line from Vitebsky railway station and is situated between Shushary and Pavlovsk on the Saint Petersburg — Vitebsk line. The station hosts suburban trains from Saint-Petersburg, Novolisino, Posyolok, Oredezh, Luga and Veliky Novgorod. Electric trains ED4M, ER2T and DT1 make a passenger trips from Tsarskoye Selo station. Long-distance trains do not stop at Tsarskoye Selo station except train from Velikiye Luki. The station is approximately 1 km from the town center. It has official status as an object of Russian cultural heritage.

History 
The Tsarkoe Selo station was opened on 22 May 1838 with the construction of the first in Russian Empire Tsarskoye Selo Railway from Saint-Petersburg to Pavlovsk. Construction began in May 1836, and the first test trips were carried out the same year between Tsarskoye Selo and Pavlovsk, using horse-drawn trains. The first station building was built according to the project of Swiss architect Gaspare Fossati. The building was designed in the English Gothic style. It was a two-story brick building with a quadrangular tower and two side one-storey wooden phases. Awnings were installed to the side phases, leaning on cast-iron pillars and wrought-iron curly arms.

In 1902–1904 on the site of the old building was built a new project by a group of architects under the leadership of S. A. Brzhozovsky. Symmetrical building was designed in the late eclecticism characteristic for Western Europe. To the left of the station there was the Grand Princely Pavilion. Both buildings were destroyed during the Second world war. Tsarskoye Selo station was renamed to Detskoye Selo after the Great October revolution.

The third station building was built from 1946 to 1950 by the project of the Leningrad architect Evgeny Levinson and engineer Andrey Grushke. Their project was honored the Stalin Prize. The station complex includes the main two-story building and three pavilions. In the pavilions there are descents in tunnels under railway tracks. The general composition is designed in strict classical forms, which are typical for Pushkin's architecture. The design of the facades and interiors reflects the connection of the city with biography and creation of Russian poet Alexander Pushkin. The facade of the main building is decorated with medallions and bas-relief portraits of teachers and friends of the poet such as Gavriil Derzhavin, Nikolai Karamzin, Vasiliy Zhukovsky, Anton Delvig, Pyotor Chaadayev, Wilhelm Küchelbecker. A bronze sculpture of Alexander Pushkin by the sculptor Matvey Manizer was installed in the waiting room, divided by two rows of columns A plafond of the hall is decorated with panels depicting the constructions of the Tsarskoye Selo parks. The booking hall is decorated with paintings in the form of trees with widely spaced branches. On the walls are placed bas-reliefs with a profile portrait of Alexander Pushkin. Overdoors and iron chandeliers, white matte and blue glass complement the decoration of the hall.

In USSR times, from 1932 to mid 1960s, a dedicated railroad line existed between Detskoe Selo station and Kolpino railway station in neighboring industrial Kolpino city. Line had one stop in the middle, and its main purpose was transportation of workers to Kolpino's Izhorskiye Zavody industrial complex. The line was temporarily dismantled during Great Patriotic War.

Tsarskoye Selo station was electrified DC and equipped with automatic train protection in 1953. On 6 August 2013, the original name, Tsarskoye Selo, was returned.

See also 
 Imperatorsky pavilyon railway station

References 

Railway stations in Saint Petersburg
Railway stations in the Russian Empire opened in 1838
Transport infrastructure completed in 1898
Tsarskoye Selo
Cultural heritage monuments of federal significance in Saint Petersburg